Rutterford is a surname. Notable people with the surname include: 

Alex Rutterford, British director and graphic designer
Colin Rutterford (born 1943), English cricketer
Julie Rutterford, British screenwriter

See also
Rutherford (disambiguation)